John Albert "Socko" Wiethe (October 17, 1912May 3, 1989) was an early all-around sports star in football, baseball and basketball. He played professional American football guard/linebacker in the National Football League. He played four seasons for the Detroit Lions (1939–1942). He also briefly played in the National Basketball League during the late 1930s, and also played independent pro baseball. He later coached both football and then basketball at the University of Cincinnati. In later years, he was also active in local Cincinnati politics as a Democrat.

Head coaching record

References

External links

 

1912 births
1989 deaths
American football linebackers
American football offensive guards
American men's basketball players
Baseball players from Cincinnati
Basketball coaches from Ohio
Basketball players from Cincinnati
Cincinnati Bearcats football coaches
Cincinnati Bearcats men's basketball coaches
Cincinnati Comellos coaches
Cincinnati Comellos players
Detroit Lions players
High school basketball coaches in the United States
Players of American football from Cincinnati
Xavier Musketeers baseball players
Xavier Musketeers football players
Xavier Musketeers men's basketball players